Seyed Ali Kashefi Khansari (born February 11, 1972, in Tehran) is an Iranian children's writer and editor-in-chief of Iranian children literature magazine Soroush Nojavan.

Life
Seyyed Ali Kashefi Khansari was born in 1972, Tehran. When he was 20 years old he officially started working as a journalist. He has written more than a hundred articles and more than 200 statement about Children's Literature. There is 95 published books written by him which are usually about the criticism and the history of Children's Literature and Publications. He has received 16 awards for his works.

He has also worked in many NGO’s and public organizations,  having responsibilities in the topic of Literature, Theater and Press.
He has held many conferences in international festivals and exhibitions held in 19 different countries like Spain, Germany, India, Indonesia and Lebanon.He has worked as the Chief Editor of 15 magazines which the best known of them are Children & Young Adults’ Quarterly Book Review and also Shahrzad, a monthly magazine about childhood & parenthood.

References

Living people
1972 births
Iranian literary critics
Iranian children's writers